The Northern Lower Austria Alps or Lower Austria Alps (Niederösterreichische Nordalpen in German) is the proposed name for a subdivision of mountains in a new, and as yet unadopted, classification of the Alps. They are the northernmost section of the Alps.

Geography 
Administratively the range belongs to the Austrian state of Lower Austria and, marginally, to the states of Upper Austria and Styria.
The whole range is drained by the Danube river.

SOIUSA classification 
According to the proposal by SOIUSA (International Standardized Mountain Subdivision of the Alps), the mountain range is an Alpine section, classified in the following way:
 main part = Eastern Alps
 major sector = Northern Limestone Alps
 section = Northern Lower Austria Alps
 code = II/B-27

Subdivision 
Lower Austria Alps are divided into three Alpine subsections:
 Türnitzer Alpen - SOIUSA code:II/B-27.I;
 Ybbstaler Alpen - SOIUSA code:II/B-27.II;
 Östliche Niederösterreichische Voralpen - SOIUSA code:II/B-27.III.

Summits

The chief summits of the range are:

References

Mountain ranges of the Alps
Mountain ranges of Upper Austria
Mountain ranges of Lower Austria
Mountain ranges of Styria